Sainte-Catherine is an off-island suburb of Montreal, in southwestern Quebec, Canada, on the St. Lawrence River in the Regional County Municipality of Roussillon. The population as of the Canada 2011 Census was 16,762.

History 
The land had been occupied for more than three centuries, since the establishment of the Iroquois mission in 1676, it is only in 1937 that the founding of la paroisse de Sainte-Catherine de Laprairie really marks a territorial organization. In 1973, a demographic boom finally granted the status of town to the village. In 2006, according to the city's official site, there were 17,000 inhabitants in Sainte-Catherine.

The inauguration of the Honoré Mercier Bridge in 1934, and then of the Champlain Bridge in 1962, greatly boosted the local economy.

Demographics 

Famous natives 
Guillaume Latendresse, NHL player
Pierre Carl Ouellet, professional wrestler
Karine Sergerie, women's taekwondo champion, Olympian

See also 
 Saint-Regis River
 List of cities in Quebec

References 

Cities and towns in Quebec
Incorporated places in Roussillon Regional County Municipality
Quebec populated places on the Saint Lawrence River
Greater Montreal
Canada geography articles needing translation from French Wikipedia